Delta Sports Complex, formerly named as Delta Sports and Recreation Centre, is located in Bukit Merah, Singapore beside the Redhill MRT station. Its central location is designed to serve the sporting needs of many people of different ages, with a well maintained hockey pitch it has also contributed to the local development of hockey, with occasional competitions held there.

Opened to the public on 7 November 1997, the sports complex has continued to expand ever since. The Delta Sports Complex facilities includes ActiveSG Gym, swimming pool, hockey pitch and an indoor sports hall. 

The public swimming facility was closed for renovation and upgrading on 1 September 2019. It was greatly delayed due to the COVID-19 pandemic, and it is supposed to finally reopen on 31 July 2022.

References

Bukit Merah
Buildings and structures in Central Region, Singapore
Sports venues in Singapore